An exercise dress or workout dress is an item of athletic apparel.

History
Exercise dresses were marketed by the brand Outdoor Voices in 2018 and according to the Wall Street Journal became a "viral hit". By 2020 Under Armour and Athleta were also marketing the dresses.

Description
The dresses typically incorporate a bodysuit including bike shorts under a racerback A-line dress, often with a pocket in the shorts to accommodate a phone, keys, or credit card. They are constructed in some combination of nylon and spandex. Wearers step into the shorts through the neckline and pull the dress up to put it on. According to Cosmopolitan, the dresses are appropriate for general daywear and "literally no one would know you just wore it to the gym".

Response 
Women have experienced stares and double-takes when exercising in an exercise dress.

See also
 Fitness fashion
 Sportswear (activewear)
 Spandex

References

Sportswear
Dresses